Juha Petteri Ylönen (born February 13, 1972) is a Finnish former professional ice hockey centre.  He was selected by the Winnipeg Jets in the fifth round, 91st overall, of the 1991 NHL Entry Draft.

Playing career

Ylönen played five seasons in Finland's SM-liiga before coming to North America to play.  He joined the Phoenix Coyotes (which Winnipeg had become after relocation) organization for the 1996–97 season, appearing in two NHL games that season; he had the best production of his career that season for the AHL Springfield Falcons, scoring 61 points in 70 games and adding 21 points in the playoffs.  He then played four full seasons with the Coyotes until he was traded prior to the 2001–02 season to the Tampa Bay Lightning in exchange for Todd Warriner.  Ylönen played 65 games for the Lightning that season, but was dealt to the Ottawa Senators at the trade deadline in exchange for Andre Roy and a pick in the 2002 NHL Entry Draft.

After the 2001–02 season, Ylönen left the NHL and returned to Finland to play.  He played two seasons for the Espoo Blues, with the last being the 2003–04 season.

In his NHL career, Ylönen appeared in 341 games.  He scored 26 goals and added 76 assists.  He also appeared in 15 Stanley Cup playoff games, recording seven assists.  In addition, he won a bronze medal as a member of the Finnish team at the 1998 Winter Olympics.

Personal life
His son Jesse was drafted in the second round, 35th overall, by the Montreal Canadiens in the 2018 NHL Entry Draft.

Career statistics

Regular season and playoffs

International

References

External links

1972 births
Espoo Blues players
Finnish ice hockey centres
HPK players
Ice hockey players at the 1998 Winter Olympics
Ice hockey players at the 2002 Winter Olympics
Jokerit players
Living people
Olympic bronze medalists for Finland
Olympic ice hockey players of Finland
Ottawa Senators players
Ice hockey people from Helsinki
Phoenix Coyotes players
Springfield Falcons players
Tampa Bay Lightning players
Olympic medalists in ice hockey
Medalists at the 1998 Winter Olympics
Winnipeg Jets (1979–1996) draft picks